Newcombia is a genus of tropical tree-living air-breathing land snails, arboreal pulmonate gastropod mollusks in the family Achatinellidae.

The Hawaiian tree snail genus Newcombia is a member of the family Achatinellidae and the endemic Hawaiian subfamily Achatinellinae. The genus is endemic to the islands of Maui and Molokai, Hawaii. Six of the known species were endemic to Molokai (Newcombia canaliculata, Newcombia lirata, Newcombia perkinsi, Newcombia pfeifferi, Newcombia philippiana, and Newcombia sulcata), and only one species, Newcombia cumingi, is known from the island of Maui. Henry Augustus Pilsbry and Charles Montague Cooke, Jr. (1912-1914) is the most recent and accepted taxonomy for this genus.

Species
Species within the genus Newcombia include:
 Newcombia canaliculata Baldwin, 1905
 Newcombia cumingi Sykes, 1896
 Newcombia lirata Mighels, 1912
 Newcombia perkinsi Sykes, 1896
 Newcombia pfeifferi Newcomb, 1853
† Newcombia philippiana Pfeiffer, 1850
 Newcombia sulcata Pfeiffer, 1857
†=extinct

References
This article incorporates public domain text from the reference

 
Molluscs of Hawaii
Endemic fauna of Hawaii
Taxonomy articles created by Polbot